Maimul Ahsan Khan (born December 22, 1954) is a Bangladeshi scholar of jurisprudence and comparative law and a former professor of law at the Faculty of Law, University of Dhaka. His expertise encompasses jurisprudence, Islamic law, Islam and Muslim culture, political science, human rights, Middle Eastern, South Asian and Oriental studies. He was awarded IIE-SRF fellowship for his academic contribution by the Institute of International Education (IIE). In 2012, the IIE Scholar Rescue Fund featured him as one of the persecuted academics in the world. Khan is currently serving as the Dean of the Faculty of Social Science at Leading University.

Biography

Origin and education
Born on December 22, 1954, in Chandpur, Bangladesh, Khan studied in the former Soviet Union and obtained his LLM with honors in 1981 and a PhD in jurisprudence in 1985 from Tashkent State University. He received a master's in international commercial law from the University of California, Davis.

Career
Khan began his academic career as a Research Fellow at the U.K. based Islamic Foundation in Markfield, Leicestershire in 1986 and was appointed assistant professor of law at the University of Dhaka in 1990. He became a full professor at the same university in 2007. Khan taught at the University of Illinois-UIUC from 1998 to 2002, the University of California-Davis and Berkeley from 2002 to 2006, and the Technical University of Liberec-Czech Republic. He has served as a Fulbright Fellow at the College of Law in University of Illinois-UC and as a country specialist on Afghanistan at Amnesty International (2001-2006).
 
Khan chaired the Department of Law at the University of Dhaka and the Islamic University, Bangladesh at Gazipur (Later on this university was moved permanently to Kushtia), and has served as a Research Fellow at Bangladesh Institute of International and Strategic Studies. He was one of the judges of the international symbolic court held at Imam Sadiq University in Tehran that sentenced  Myanmar's de facto leader Aung San Suu Kyi to fifteen years in jail for her support for an ethnic cleansing campaign against the country's minority Rohingya Muslims.

Views
Khan supports a moderate interpretation of the Quran and rejects  what some refer to as "extreme" or "political" Islam. He believes that legal ideas dating back to the Prophet Mohammed's time have been distorted by governments and colonization, resulting in what is presently known as "Muslim law" rather than pure "Islamic law" in practice. He refers to Muslim extremists as "Muslim fundamentalists". Khan hopes to encourage dialogue and cross-cultural understanding among the world's nations by eradicating sectarianism, particularly from Muslim societies.

Selected works
Khan has authored books and scholarly articles in English, Russian and Bengali. His books include:

In English

 
 
 
 
 
 
 
 
 

In Bangla

 
 
 
 
 
 
 
 
 
 
 

 Edited

 
 

 Translated (into Bangla)

References

External links
 Google Scholar Page
 Official Web Page at Dhaka University
 Interview with Tasnim News Agency

Academic staff of the University of Dhaka
University of California, Davis alumni
Living people
1954 births
Bangladeshi scholars
Legal scholars
Jurisprudence academics
Scholars of comparative law
Academic staff of the Islamic University, Bangladesh
Academic staff of the Technical University of Liberec